Ålholm station is a commuter rail railway station serving the northwestern part of the district of Valby in Copenhagen, Denmark. It is located on the Ring Line of Copenhagen's S-train network. The station opened on 8 January 2005 where Roskildevej crosses the railway line.

Railway stations in Valby
S-train (Copenhagen) stations
Railway stations opened in 2005
Railway stations in Denmark opened in the 21st century